East Fork Falls is a waterfall along East Fork Pine Creek in the U.S. state of Oregon just east of Baker City in the south stretch of the Wallowa–Whitman National Forest.

East Fork Falls are a short distance north of the ghost town of Cornucopia along the Oregon-Idaho border. Access to East Fork in the Southern Wallowa Mountains starting at the Cornucopia trailhead up trail East Fork #1865.

See also 
 List of waterfalls in Oregon

References

Waterfalls of Oregon